"The Look of Love" is a popular song composed by Burt Bacharach and Hal David and originally popularized by English pop singer Dusty Springfield. The song is notable for its sensuality and its relaxed bossa nova rhythm. The song was featured in the 1967 spoof James Bond film Casino Royale. In 2008, the song was inducted into the Grammy Hall of Fame. It also received a Best Song nomination at the 1968 Academy Awards. The song partially inspired the film Austin Powers: International Man of Mystery (1997).

Songwriters
The music was written by Burt Bacharach, and was originally intended to be an instrumental. But later Hal David added the lyrics, and the song was published in 1967. According to Bacharach, the melody was inspired by watching Ursula Andress in an early cut of the film.

Recordings

Early recordings
Stan Getz made the first recording of the song, an instrumental version, in December 1966 for his album What the World Needs Now: Stan Getz Plays Burt Bacharach and Hal David. The first recording featuring the song's lyrics was by Dusty Springfield, for the Casino Royale soundtrack. Phil Ramone, the soundtrack's engineer, recorded the song separately from the rest of the film tracks. The film version received an Oscar nomination for songwriters Bacharach and David. Springfield re-recorded the song the same year for Philips Records with an arrangement about half a minute shorter than the soundtrack version. Both Springfield versions feature a breathy tenor saxophone solo similar in style to Stan Getz's playing on his early-1960s bossa nova hit recordings like "The Girl from Ipanema" and "Corcovado (Quiet Nights of Quiet Stars)".  Her Philips single version reached #22 in the U.S. Billboard Hot 100 in November 1967. Springfield's Philips version was later featured in the 2002 film Catch Me If You Can.

Claudine Longet recorded the song on her 1967 album of the same title. Lainie Kazan also recorded "The Look of Love" (arranged by Pat Williams) on her 1967 album Love Is Lainie. Nina Simone also recorded "The Look of Love" in 1967 on her album Silk & Soul. Morgana King recorded "The Look of Love" on her 1967 album Gemini Rising.

Sérgio Mendes' hit rendition on the Sérgio Mendes & Brasil '66 album Look Around reached #4 on the pop charts after their performance in the Academy Awards telecast in April 1968. The lead vocal on this single was handled by Janis Hansen, not Lani Hall, a rarity in the early Brasil '66 canon. Andy Williams released a version in 1967 on his album, Love, Andy, while Nancy Wilson included the song on her 1968 album Easy. Soul group The Delfonics also covered the song in 1968 on their album La La Means I Love You, while the legendary Motown quartet Four Tops gave the song a sweeping Broadway-like treatment on their 1969 album Soul Spin. Brazilian threesome Som Três recorded an early instrumental version on their album Show (Odeon, 1968). Dorothy Ashby included the song in her 1968 album Afro-Harping. An instrumental version of the song was included on the 1967 Burt Bacharach album Reach Out, which was also featured on the soundtrack for the film The Boys in the Band.

Impact
Actor and comedian Mike Myers said his film Austin Powers: International Man of Mystery was partially inspired by "The Look of Love". Myers said hearing the song on the radio led to him reminiscing about the 1960s, which helped inspire the movie.

References
Footnotes

Bibliography

External links
 Sérgio Mendes interview by Pete Lewis, 'Blues & Soul' July 2008
 

1960s ballads
1967 songs
1967 singles
1968 singles
1971 singles
Grammy Hall of Fame Award recipients
Songs with music by Burt Bacharach
Songs with lyrics by Hal David
Isaac Hayes songs
Diana Krall songs
Shelby Lynne songs
Nancy Wilson (jazz singer) songs
Nina Simone songs
Dusty Springfield songs
Dionne Warwick songs
Gladys Knight & the Pips songs
Shirley Bassey songs
Scott Walker (singer) songs
Andy Williams songs
Songs from James Bond films
Bossa nova songs
Pop ballads
Anita Baker songs
Song recordings produced by Phil Ramone
A&M Records singles